Ira Sandperl (March 11, 1923 – April 13, 2013) was an American anti-war activist and educator. He influenced students and heroes of the anti-war, civil rights, and peace movements, including Martin Luther King Jr., David Harris, Bob Dylan, John Lennon, Lawrence Ferlinghetti, Allen Ginsberg, Daniel Ellsberg, Thomas Merton, and Joan Baez with whom he formed the Institute for the Study of Non-violence. Sandperl became a national figure in the antiwar movement of the 1960s, according to New York Times reporter and longtime friend John Markoff.

Early life 
Sandperl was born in St. Louis, Missouri and raised in a Jewish household by Harry and Ione Sandperl. His father was a surgeon and his mother was a follower of Norman Thomas, leading Mr. Sandperl early on to be exposed to both socialist and pacifist ideals. He attended Stanford University but dropped out after his attempts to join the armed forces in the ambulance corps was denied because of a childhood bout with polio. Neighbors and close family friends with the journalist John Markoff (who jokingly credits Sandperl with his verbosity). As a student there he tried to generate sympathy among the faculty for the Japanese-Americans in concentration camps. He left to Mexico returning after World War II to Palo Alto where he taught meditation and Sunday school classes at the Palo Alto Friend's Church, and lectured at Stanford. In 1955 he was hired at the influential Kepler's Books as the very first employee. He engaged customers on political topics as well as advice on literature and introduced a generation of draft-age men to nonviolence during the Vietnam War.

Social and political involvement 

In his life Sandperl worked with leaders of the Free Speech movement at the University of California, Berkeley, the civil rights movement, and the Vietnam War peace movement and  organizations of similar interests.  In the Bay Area he was a fixture at Kepler's, a bookstore that became a center of counterculture, drawing the youth and students of nearby universities to listen to his ideas of non-violence and fascinations with Mahatma Gandhi.

Protesting at a quaker meeting in Palo Alto in 1959, urging them to refuse payment of war taxes, Sandperl met Joan Baez when she was a senior in high school and through their interests in various philosophies and political causes they developed a friendship. In 1965 they founded together the Institute for the Study of Non-violence in Carmel Valley, California with Sandperl running the general operations and funding coming from Baez. The school invited a small number of students each year (in order of applications received) to learn the principles of nonviolence, partake in readings, meditation, and discussion. Some local residents of Carmel were frustrated by the image that the school represented and fought the school from continuing operations. The episode is recounted in Joan Didion's essay "Where the Kissing Never Stops" first published in 1966 under the title "Just Folks at a School for Non-Violence" in The New York Times Magazine. and reprinted in her collection of essays Slouching Towards Bethlehem.

In 1966, Sandperl accompanied Baez to Grenada, Mississippi to join in a campaign to help desegregate local schools with Martin Luther King Jr. Two years later King visited them in Santa Rita prison, where the two served 45 day sentences for trying to shut down the Oakland, California draft induction center for "Stop the Draft Week." King said that he made the visit "because they helped me so much in the South." King also famously sent members of his organization, the Southern Christian Leadership Conference, to study with Ira on the subjects of organizing and non-violent tactics.

The nationally famous catholic monk and non-violent activist, Thomas Merton, met with Sandperl and Baez in December 1966 at the Abbey of Gethsemane in Kentucky where he lived. Their discussions strongly influenced Merton and his changing philosophy of activism despite being a monk and he wrote about them in his journals and his book New Seeds of Contemplation. Merton also kept up with Mr. Sandperl through correspondence during his travels through Asia from 1966 through 1967 considering Sandperl an authority on Gandhi's teachings of non-violence.

Death
Sandperl died on April 13, 2013, at home in Menlo Park, California, surrounded by friends and his books. He was 90 years old.

References 

 

1923 births
2013 deaths
American anti–Vietnam War activists
Activists from St. Louis
Stanford University alumni
American expatriates in Mexico